William Finley or Finlay may refer to:

 William Finlay (1853–1914), Irish-born Canadian politician
 William Finlay (mayor) (1840–1885), mayor of Albany, Western Australia
 William Finley (actor) (1940–2012), American actor
 William Finley (Southern Railway), president of the Southern Railway in the United States, 1906–1913
 William A. Finley (1839–1912), president of Oregon State University, 1865–1872
 William L. Finley (1876–1953), American wildlife photographer and conservationist
 William Finlay, 2nd Viscount Finlay (1875–1945), British barrister and judge
 William Henry Finlay, South African astronomer
 Willie Finlay (1926–2014), Scottish footballer for East Fife and Clyde

Similar spellings
William Findlay (disambiguation)
William Findley (disambiguation)